Brenac is a former commune in the Aude department in southern France. On 1 January 2016, it was merged into the commune of Quillan.

Population

See also
Communes of the Aude department

References

Former communes of Aude
Aude communes articles needing translation from French Wikipedia
Populated places disestablished in 2016